Neotinea tridentata, the  three-toothed orchid, is a species of orchid found in southern Europe from Spain to Turkey; northwards to the Crimea, Poland and Germany. This orchid favours grassy places, woodland, scrub and maquis.

Taxonomy

The genus Neotinea is named after an Italian botanist, Vincenzo Tineo (1791-1856), who was Director of Palermo botanical garden and later the Chancellor of Palermo University. His published works include 'Plantarum rariorum Sicilae' (1817) and 'Catalogus plantarum horti' (1827). The specific epithet tridentata is Latin for three-toothed, a reference to the three main lobes of the labellum. This species was formerly placed in the genus Orchis as O. tridentata. Orchis comes from the Greek for testicle, a reference to the shape of some species' tuberous roots.

References

External links 
 
  J. Claessens, J. Kleynen: European orchids - Valgus hemipterus pollinator of Neotinea tridentata (Orchis tridentata)

Orchideae
Orchids of Lebanon
Orchids of Europe
Flora of Poland
Flora of Turkey